André Alerme (9 September 1877 – 31 January 1960) was a French actor.

Alerme was born Marie André Alerme in Dieppe, Seine-Maritime, France and died at the age of 82 in Montrichard, Loir-et-Cher, France.

Selected filmography
 Black and White (1931)
 His Highness Love (1931)
 The Wonderful Day (1932)
 Orange Blossom (1932)
 His Best Client (1932)
 La dame de chez Maxim's (1933)
 Miquette (1934)
 Tovaritch (1935)
 Carnival in Flanders (1935)
 On the Road (1936)
 The Secret of Polichinelle (1936)
 Counsel for Romance (1936)
 The Assault (1936)
 The Man of the Hour (1937)
 The Silent Battle (1937)
 Mademoiselle ma mère (1938)
 Le drame de Shanghaï (1938)
 Nord-Atlantique (1939)
 Paradise Lost (1940)
 Romance of Paris (1941)
 Patricia (1942)
 The Blue Veil (1942)
 The Phantom Baron (1943)
 Arlette and Love (1943)
 The White Waltz (1943)
 The Man Without a Name (1943)
Farandole (1945)
 The Black Cavalier (1945)
 The Misfortunes of Sophie (1946)
 Lessons in Conduct (1946)
 Banco de Prince (1950)
 This Age Without Pity (1952)

References

External links

1877 births
1960 deaths
French male film actors
French male stage actors
People from Dieppe, Seine-Maritime
20th-century French male actors